Cridmore Bog is a  Site of special scientific interest which is west of Godshill. The site was notified in 1985 for its biological features. It is adjacent to "The Wilderness", another SSSI in this area of the Isle of Wight

References

Natural England citation sheet

Sites of Special Scientific Interest on the Isle of Wight
Bogs of England